Philip Andersen is a Danish race car driver born 15 November 1980 who competed in the Danish Touring Car Championship from 2003 until 2004. For the two years before that he drove in Formula Renault 2000 Eurocup.  As of 2006 he drove in the Le Mans Series Championship in LMP1 for the team Zytek; he is the driver N°3 of the car n°2 (a Zytec 06S).

24 Hours of Le Mans results

References

Danish racing drivers
German Formula Renault 2.0 drivers
Nordic Formula Renault 2.0 drivers
Formula Renault Eurocup drivers
24 Hours of Le Mans drivers
Danish Touring Car Championship drivers
1980 births
Living people
European Le Mans Series drivers

Super Nova Racing drivers
Jota Sport drivers